Nasria Baghdad-Azaïdj (born 29 October 1971) is an Algerian long-distance runner. She competed in the women's marathon at the 2004 Summer Olympics in which she did not finish the race.

References

External links
 

1971 births
Living people
Athletes (track and field) at the 2000 Summer Olympics
Athletes (track and field) at the 2004 Summer Olympics
Algerian female long-distance runners
Algerian female marathon runners
Olympic athletes of Algeria
Athletes (track and field) at the 2001 Mediterranean Games
Place of birth missing (living people)
Mediterranean Games competitors for Algeria
21st-century Algerian people
20th-century Algerian people